Manish Goel is an Indian film and television actor. He was the winner of the reality show Welcome – Baazi Mehmaan Nawazi Ki.

Goel made his television debut with Kahaani Ghar Ghar Kii. He also appeared in reality shows like, Zara Nachke Dikha, Welcome – Baazi Mehmaan Nawazi Ki, BIG Memsaab. He played the lead role of Tilak in Bhabhi on Star Plus.

Television

References

External links 

 

People from Delhi
Indian male soap opera actors
Indian male film actors
1975 births
Living people
Indian male television actors
Reality show winners
Actors from Mumbai